Toni Naumoski (born 2 August 1968) is a retired Macedonian football midfielder.

References

1968 births
Living people
Macedonian footballers
FK Pelister players
FK Pobeda players
FK Makedonija Gjorče Petrov players
Association football midfielders
North Macedonia international footballers